Artur Ostrowski (born 29 August 1968 in Piotrków Trybunalski) is a Polish politician. He was elected to the Sejm on 25 September 2005, getting 7,043 votes in 10 Piotrków Trybunalski district as a candidate from Democratic Left Alliance list.

See also
Members of Polish Sejm 2005-2007

External links
Artur Ostrowski - parliamentary page - includes declarations of interest, voting record, and transcripts of speeches.

1968 births
Living people
People from Piotrków Trybunalski
Democratic Left Alliance politicians
Members of the Polish Sejm 2005–2007
Members of the Polish Sejm 2007–2011
Members of the Polish Sejm 2011–2015